Sedgefield is a constituency in County Durham represented in the House of Commons of the UK Parliament since 2019 by Paul Howell of the Conservative Party. It elects one Member of Parliament (MP) by the first past the post system of election.

History

1918–1974 
Sedgefield was first created under the Representation of the People Act 1918 for the 1918 general election, comprising primarily southern parts of the abolished South Eastern Division of Durham, including the communities of Segefield and Billingham. It also included parts of the former Mid Durham seat (Ferryhill) and a small area transferred from Bishop Auckland (Chilton).

It was abolished for the February 1974 general election, when its contents were distributed to the neighbouring seats of Bishop Auckland (Darlington RD), Durham (Sedgefield RD), Easington (Stockton RD) and Teesside, Stockton (Billingham UD).

1983–present 
The constituency was recreated at the next redistribution, which came into effect at the 1983 general election, with similar boundaries, but excluding Billingham and Newton Aycliffe and including Spennymoor.

Boundaries

1918–1950 

 The Rural Districts of Darlington, Hartlepool, Sedgefield, and Stockton

1950-1974 

 The Urban District of Billingham; and
 the Rural Districts of Darlington, Sedgefield and Stockton.

Minor changes - the Rural District of Stockton had been altered, absorbing the Rural District of Hartlepool, but losing Billingham to a new urban district.

From 1955, the boundaries of the Rural Districts of Darlington, Sedgefield and Stockton were altered in line with changes to local authority boundaries.

1983–1997 

 The District of Sedgefield wards of Bishop Middleham, Broom, Chilton, Cornforth, Ferryhill, Fishburn, Low Spennymoor and Tudhoe Grange, Middlestone, New Trimdon and Trimdon Grange, Old Trimdon, Sedgefield, Spennymoor, and Tudhoe;
 the District of Easington wards of Deaf Hill, Hutton Henry, Thornley, Wheatley Hill, and Wingate; and
 the Borough of Darlington wards of Heighington, Hurworth, Middleton St George, Sadberge, and Whessoe.

Spennymoor and Tudhoe transferred from North West Durham; remainder of District of Sedgefield wards from Durham; District of Easington wards from Easington; and Borough of Darlington wards from Bishop Auckland.

1997–2010 

 The District of Sedgefield wards of Bishop Middleham, Broom, Chilton, Cornforth, Ferryhill, Fishburn, Middridge, Neville, New Trimdon and Trimdon Grange, Old Trimdon, Sedgefield, Shafto, Simpasture, West, and Woodham;
 the District of Easington wards of Deaf Hill, Hutton Henry, Thornley, Wheatley Hill, and Wingate; and
 the Borough of Darlington wards of Heighington, Hurworth, Middleton St George, Sadberge, and Whessoe.

Newton Aycliffe transferred in from Bishop Auckland in exchange for Spennymoor and Tudhoe.

2010–present 

 The Borough of Sedgefield wards of Bishop Middleham and Cornforth, Broom, Chilton, Ferryhill, Fishburn and Old Trimdon, Greenfield Middridge, Neville and Simpasture, New Trimdon and Trimdon Grange, Sedgefield, Shafto St Mary's, West, and Woodham; 
 the District of Easington wards of Thornley and Wheatley Hill, and Wingate; and
 the Borough of Darlington wards of Heighington and Coniscliffe, Hurworth, Middleton St George, Sadberge, and Whessoe.

Minor changes only to reflect redrawing of local authority ward boundaries.

In the 2009 structural changes to local government in England, the local authority districts in Durham were abolished and replaced with a single unitary authority; however, this has not affected the boundaries of the constituency.

Proposed constituency changes 
The 2023 Boundary Review Initial Proposals have recommended that all the wards in the borough of Darlington should be removed from the seat, with Shildon moving in from Bishop Auckland and Coxhoe from City of Durham. The reconfigured seat would be renamed ‘Newton Aycliffe and Sedgefield’.

Political history 
From its recreation in 1983 until 27 June 2007, the Member of Parliament was Tony Blair, who led a successful campaign for his party to win the 1997 general election in a landslide and thereafter served for ten years as the Prime Minister, leading the campaigns at two subsequent general elections. Blair was the first Prime Minister to lead the Labour Party to three consecutive victories. He resigned as the Member of Parliament for Sedgefield on the same day as he resigned as Prime Minister, which triggered a by-election.

At the by-election on 19 July 2007, the official Labour Party candidate Phil Wilson was elected on a reduced majority which in national terms is safe instead of marginal. While Wilson had never came close to the enormous majorities held by Blair during his tenure as MP and only secured an absolute majority of the vote for the first time at the 2017 general election, he had consistently held majorities of over 6,000 votes at every election he had stood at.

At the 2019 election, the Conservatives' candidate Paul Howell defeated Wilson with a majority of 4,513 and a swing of 12.8%. Sedgefield was one of the 48 seats net won in England by the Conservatives as well as being considered part of the so-called red wall.

Constituency profile
Sedgefield has a long mining history (extracting coal, fluorspar and iron ore) and very strong affiliation to the Labour Party, with nearly monolithic support in parts of the constituency. The area contains a mixture of former coal country in the area around Trimdon and more industrial areas around the new town of Newton Aycliffe. The construction of a new Hitachi factory created 730 jobs in the town. There are also more prosperous parts of the constituency that form the bulk of the Conservative vote – for example, the ancient market town of Sedgefield itself, with a charter dating back to 1312. The outer suburbs of Darlington are also relatively wealthy, as well as Hurworth-on-Tees, where unemployment stands at just 1.0%.

In statistics
The constituency consists of Census Output Areas of two local government districts with similar characteristics: a working population whose average income is lower than the national average and close to average reliance upon social housing.  At the end of 2012 the unemployment rate in the constituency stood as 5.0% of the population claiming jobseekers allowance, compared to the regional average of 5.5%.

The local authority contributing to the bulk of the seat has a middling 27.2% of its population without a car, a high 27.5% of the population without qualifications and a medium 21.5% with level 4 qualifications or above.  Darlington has 28% of its population without a car, 24.8% of the population without qualifications and a medium 23.7% with level 4 qualifications or above

In terms of tenure 65.8% of County Durham homes and 64.9% of Darlington homes are owned outright or on a mortgage as at the 2011 census.

Members of Parliament

MPs 1918–1974

MPs since 1983

Elections

Elections in the 2010s

Elections in the 2000s

:

:

Elections in the 1990s
:

:

Elections in the 1980s
:

:

Elections in the 1970s

Elections in the 1960s

Elections in the 1950s

Elections in the 1940s

Elections in the 1930s

Elections in the 1920s

Elections in the 1910s

See also
List of parliamentary constituencies in County Durham
History of parliamentary constituencies and boundaries in Durham

References

Parliamentary constituencies in County Durham
Constituencies of the Parliament of the United Kingdom established in 1918
Constituencies of the Parliament of the United Kingdom disestablished in 1974
Constituencies of the Parliament of the United Kingdom established in 1983
Constituencies of the Parliament of the United Kingdom represented by a sitting Prime Minister
Tony Blair